"Back at You" is a 1996 single by hip-hop duo Mobb Deep. The song was featured on the soundtrack album for the film Sunset Park. The b-side featured another song from the film's soundtrack, "Elements I'm Among" by Queen Latifah.

Track listing 
Side A

 Mobb Deep - Back at You (Soundtrack Version - Clean)
 Mobb Deep - Back  at You (Soundtrack Version)
 Mobb Deep - Back at You (Instrumental)

Side B

 Queen Latifah - Elements I'm Among (Soundtrack Version - Clean)
 Queen Latifah - Elements I'm Among (Soundtrack Version)
 Queen Latifah - Elements I'm Among (Instrumental)

References  

1996 songs
Mobb Deep songs
Music videos directed by Diane Martel
Songs with music by Burt Bacharach
Songs with lyrics by Hal David
Song recordings produced by Havoc (musician)
Songs written by Havoc (musician)
Songs written by Prodigy (rapper)